Joseph Carl Shaw (March 31, 1955 – January 11, 1985) was an American convicted murderer who was the first person to be executed by the state of South Carolina after the U.S. Supreme Court reauthorized the use of capital punishment by the states in 1976. Shaw was executed for the 1977 murders of three people in Richland County, South Carolina. One of his accomplices, James Terry Roach, was also sentenced to death, and was executed in 1986.

Early life
Joseph Carl Shaw was born to Mary and Melvin Shaw in Louisville, Kentucky and grew up in the suburb of Jeffersontown. He attended St. Edwards Catholic Middle School, and played on the football team. Shaw also regularly attended church and became an altar boy. After leaving St. Edwards he moved on to Jeffersontown High School, but dropped out before graduating.

After leaving high school, Shaw enlisted into the army and later sought admission to the Military Police School. He graduated in 1975 and was stationed at Fort Jackson in Columbia, South Carolina. It was there that he met James Terry Roach, Ronald Eugene Mahaffey and Robert Neil Williams. The four men would often spend their days getting high and drinking alcohol. Shaw also got into a relationship with a woman around this time as well, but the relationship ended abruptly on October 16, 1977.

Murders

Betty Swank
After the sudden end of his relationship, Shaw, Roach, Mahaffey, and Williams consumed large quantities of drugs and alcohol. Wanting revenge, Shaw and his accomplices decided to go out and find a woman to rape. In the early hours of October 17, the four men came across Betty Swank. The men offered her a ride in their car. Once Swank got inside, she saw that they were in possession of a gun. She was kidnapped, raped, and then murdered by Shaw, who shot her with a .22 caliber pistol. Her dead body was found in a mobile home park.

Thomas Taylor and Carlotta Hartness
On October 29, 1977, Shaw, Roach, and Mahaffey spent the morning taking drugs and drinking alcohol. In the afternoon they decided to see if they could find a girl to rape. The three men drove to a baseball park northeast of Columbia where they saw a parked car occupied by Thomas Taylor and Carlotta Hartness. Shaw pulled up beside the parked car and Roach pointed a .22 caliber rifle through the car window at Taylor demanding money. Taylor gave the men his wallet while Shaw forced Hartness into the back seat of his car. Shaw then gave orders for Roach to kill Taylor. Roach then shot and killed Taylor, who was still sitting in his parked car.

Hartness was taken to a dirt road a short distance away where she was raped repeatedly by each of the men. Hartness was shot in the head by Roach, and then shot again by Shaw, who fired into Hartness's head, killing her. The men left the scene, disposed of the rifle, and returned to the baseball park to confirm that Taylor was dead. Later that night, Shaw returned to the scene of Hartness's murder and mutilated her body. Both the bodies of Taylor and Hartness were discovered the following day.

Trial
Shaw, Roach, and Mahaffey were captured and arrested on November 3, 1977. Each of the three men were indicted for two counts of murder, two counts of conspiracy, rape, kidnapping, and armed robbery. The State elected to seek the death penalty for Shaw and Roach. As a result of plea negotiations, the State did not seek the death penalty against Mahaffey in exchange for his testimony against Shaw and Roach.

On December 12, 1977, Shaw pleaded guilty to all charges. Roach pleaded guilty to two counts of murder, rape, kidnapping and armed robbery. On December 16, 1977, both men were sentenced to death. Shaw was sentenced to death for the murders of Taylor and Hartness, and received a life sentence for the murder of Swank. Mahaffey was sentenced to life in prison, and died in 2003. Williams was not involved in the murders of Taylor and Hartness, but he received a life sentence in a separate trial for his role in the murder of Swank.

Execution
Shaw was executed by electrocution on January 11, 1985, at the Central Correctional Institution in Columbia, South Carolina, at the age of 29. His last meal was pizza and tossed salad. In his final statement he thanked his family, religious counselors, and lawyers, and apologized to his victims' families. Roach was executed the following year, also by electrocution.

See also
 Capital punishment in South Carolina
 Capital punishment in the United States
 List of people executed in South Carolina

References

1955 births
1985 deaths
American people executed for murder
People from Louisville, Kentucky
20th-century executions by South Carolina
People executed by South Carolina by electric chair
People convicted of murder by South Carolina
20th-century executions of American people
Executed people from Kentucky